Cristian Alexandru Novacek (born 8 February 1996) is a Romanian professional footballer who plays as a defender.

References

External links
 
 

1996 births
Living people
Romanian footballers
Association football midfielders
Liga I players
CS Concordia Chiajna players
Liga II players
CS Afumați players
ACS Foresta Suceava players
Liga III players